is a minor temple complex on Mount Kōya in Japan, founded in 1211 by order of Hōjō Masako for posthumous soul of Minamoto no Yoritomo and renamed "Kongō Sanmai-in" in 1219 for that of Minamoto no Sanetomo.

Hibutsu
The temple houses a hibutsu ("secret Buddha") statue which is generally hidden and displayed for only one day every five hundred years.  It will next be on display in the late 2400s.

References

Buddhist temples in Wakayama Prefecture
1211